Kelloggia galioides is a species of flowering plant in the coffee family known by the common name milk kelloggia. It is a perennial herb that is native to the Western United States.

Description
Kelloggia galioides is a rhizomatous perennial herb growing a very slender, erect stem to a maximum height near 40 centimeters. Lance-shaped green leaves are arranged oppositely on the stem, especially at axils where it branches. Each is 2 to 4 centimeters long.

A thin-branched open inflorescence produces a few small bright pink or white flowers. The flower is funnel-shaped with the rounded, hairy green fruit developing at its base. The flower has narrow, pointed lobes on its open face.  Its bloom period is from May to August.

Distribution and habitat
The plant  is native to the Western United States from Washington to California, and New Mexico to Montana.

References

External links
Calflora Database: Kelloggia galioides (Milk kelloggia)
Jepson Manual eFlora (TJM2) treatment of Kelloggia galioides
USDA Plants Profile for Kelloggia galioides (milk kelloggia)
UC Photos gallery: Kelloggia galioides

Rubieae
Flora of the Northwestern United States
Flora of the Southwestern United States
Flora of California
Flora of New Mexico
Flora of the Cascade Range
Flora of the Rocky Mountains
Flora of the Sierra Nevada (United States)
Natural history of the California Coast Ranges
Natural history of the Transverse Ranges
Flora without expected TNC conservation status